Anna Henrietta Bergendahl (born 11 December 1991) is a Swedish singer and songwriter. She took part in Swedish TV4 music program Super Troupers in 2004, and in Idol 2008 where she reached the Final 5 before being eliminated.

In 2009, Bergendahl signed for Lionheart Records. Her debut album was released on 14 April 2010. Bergendahl won Melodifestivalen 2010 with the song "This Is My Life" and represented Sweden in the Eurovision Song Contest 2010 in Norway, although she failed to qualify for the final. The song hit No. 1 on the Swedish Singles Chart on 5 March 2010.

Biography

Early life 
Bergendahl was born in Hägersten, Stockholm, and raised in Nyköping and Katrineholm. She is of partial Irish descent, as her grandmother was born and lives in Ireland. Her first performance in front of an audience was in a cathedral in York when she was only eight years old.

Idol 2008 
Bergendahl successfully applied for the TV4 talent show Idol 2008 with her rendition of Bonnie Raitt's "Have a Heart", which received praise from the jury consisting of Laila Bagge, Anders Bagge and Andreas Carlsson. She later sang songs like ABBA's "Mamma Mia", Py Bäckman's "Stad i ljus", "Save Up All Your Tears", "Bleeding Love" by Leona Lewis, "The Best" and "Over the Rainbow".

Bergendahl finished fifth in the Idol season which was later won by Kevin Borg.

In 2009, Bergendahl was approached by Kristian Lagerström and Bobby Ljunggren and asked if she wanted to record a song for Melodifestivalen 2010.

Melodifestivalen and Eurovision 2010 
Anna Bergendahl participated in Melodifestivalen 2010 with the song "This Is My Life", written and produced by Kristian Lagerström (lyrics) and Bobby Ljunggren (music). The song won the final in Ericsson Globe on 13 March 2010, with 214 points. Bergendahl represented Sweden at the Eurovision Song Contest 2010 in Oslo, Norway, where she became the first Swedish singer not to qualify for the final since the introduction of the semifinals in 2004 (although she placed 11th, just outside the top 10 qualifiers by a margin of 5 points). "This Is My Life'" was the first ballad to win Melodifestivalen since 1998 when Kärleken är won and was also Sweden's 50th entry in the Eurovision Song Contest.

2010–present: Return to Melodifestivalen and other projects 
After Eurovision Bergendahl participated in Allsång på Skansen, Sommarkrysset, and Lotta på Liseberg. She also went on a tour and sang songs from her debut album. In 2012 Bergendahl released her new album Something to Believe In with the debut single from the new album being "Live and Let Go". In 2019, she released two new singles, "Home" and "Speak Love". She participated in Melodifestivalen 2019 with the song "Ashes to Ashes". Bergendahl competed in Melodifestivalen 2020 with the song "Kingdom Come". She placed third, scoring 107 points. The song became the second most played song on Swedish airplay and also sold platinum. During late 2020, Bergendahl released her new single "Thelma and Louise". The EP Vera was released in October 2020 and contains five songs written by Bergendahl. By the end of the year, she also released her Christmas song, "It Never Snows In California". On 13 August 2021, Bergendahl released "Grain of Trust", written together with Peter Kvint.

Bergendahl returned to Melodifestivalen again in 2022 with the song "Higher Power". She made it to the final on 12 March 2022 and finished in last place with 29 points.

Discography

Studio albums

Extended plays

Singles 
As lead artist

As featured artist

Other charted songs

References

External links 

 

1991 births
Living people
Singers from Stockholm
English-language singers from Sweden
Idol (Swedish TV series) participants
Eurovision Song Contest entrants of 2010
Eurovision Song Contest entrants for Sweden
Swedish people of Irish descent
21st-century Swedish singers
21st-century Swedish women singers
Melodifestivalen contestants of 2022
Melodifestivalen contestants of 2020
Melodifestivalen contestants of 2019
Melodifestivalen contestants of 2010